Tyrie Cleveland (born September 20, 1997) is an American football wide receiver for the Philadelphia Eagles of the National Football League (NFL). He played college football at Florida.

Early years
Cleveland attended and played high school football at Westfield High School. He received offers from numerous schools before committing to Florida.

College career
As a freshman, Cleveland recorded a 98-yard receiving touchdown against LSU in a 16–10 victory that clinched the SEC East for the Gators. In the 2016 season, he finished with 14 receptions for 298 receiving yards and two receiving touchdowns. Early in the 2017 season, Cleveland had a huge play in a key Southeastern Conference matchup between the Florida Gators and the Tennessee Volunteers.  During the game, Florida quarterback Feleipe Franks completed a 63-yard Hail Mary touchdown pass to Cleveland to earn a victory at the end of the game as the time expired.  After the game, Cleveland was named the SEC Player of the Week. In the 2017 season, he finished with 22 receptions for 410 receiving yards and two receiving touchdowns. In the 2018 season, he finished with 18 receptions for 212 receiving yards and three receiving touchdowns. In the 2019 season, he finished with 25 receptions for 351 receiving yards and one receiving touchdown.

Professional career

Denver Broncos
Cleveland was selected by the Denver Broncos with the 252nd overall pick in the seventh round of the 2020 NFL Draft.

On August 31, 2021, Cleveland was waived by the Broncos and re-signed to the practice squad the next day. He was promoted to the active roster on October 20, 2021. He was waived on December 4 and re-signed to the practice squad. He was promoted to the active roster on January 7, 2022.

Cleveland made the Broncos final roster in 2022. He played in six games before being waived on November 15, 2022, and re-signed to the practice squad.

Philadelphia Eagles
On January 17, 2023, the Philadelphia Eagles signed Cleveland to their practice squad.

References

External links
Philadelphia Eagles bio
Florida Gators bio
Twitter

1997 births
Living people
Players of American football from Houston
American football wide receivers
Florida Gators football players
Denver Broncos players
Philadelphia Eagles players